Here Today is an extended play released by the hardcore punk band Violent Apathy.

Track list 

 "Bought and Sold"
 "Scathed"
 "Here Today"
 "Black Sorrow"
 "Possession"
 "La Bamba"

Personnel

 Andy Bennett II – drums
 Richard Bowser – guitar
 Tom Fuller – guitar
 Kenny Knott – vocals
 Eric Lorey – bass guitar

Violent Apathy albums
1983 EPs